Federico Moreno Torroba (3 March 189112 September 1982) was a Spanish composer, conductor, and theatrical impresario. He is especially remembered for his important contributions to the classical guitar repertoire, becoming one of the leading twentieth-century composers for the instrument. He was also one of the foremost composers of zarzuelas, a form of Spanish light opera. His 1932 zarzuela Luisa Fernanda has proved to be enduringly popular. In addition, he composed ballets, symphonic works, and piano pieces, as well as one-act operas and one full-length opera, El poeta, which premiered in 1980, starring well-known tenor Plácido Domingo. Moreno Torroba also ran his own zarzuela company, which toured extensively, especially in Latin America.

Biography and career
Over the course of his long career, Moreno Torroba composed many works, both in traditional Spanish forms and for the concert hall. He is often associated with the zarzuela, a traditional Spanish musical form. He achieved his greatest success in the 1930s with the zarzuelas Luisa Fernanda (1932) and La Chulapona (1934). Directing several opera companies, Moreno Torroba helped introduce the zarzuela to international audiences. In 1946 he formed a zarzuela company with singers Plácido Domingo Ferrer and Pepita Embil, the parents of Plácido Domingo and close friends of his. The company toured Latin America for two years, becoming particularly popular in Mexico. The composer who was identified from the beginning with the phalanx, to be on the national side. decided to go to America in 1946 to avoid the economic and food shortages of the postwar Spain.

Moreno Torroba also composed operas, of which La Virgen de Mayo (1925) and El poeta (1980) with Plácido Domingo in the title role, are his best known. In addition to his vocal works, he is well known for his compositions for the classical guitar, many of which were dedicated to either Maria Angélica Funes or Andrés Segovia. Although he did not play the guitar himself he had a deep understanding of the instrument, according to the virtuoso Pepe Romero.  He also frequently conducted.

Torroba is also the composer of Cuban Boy, the Frank Chacksfield recorded version of which is known as the theme tune for the BBC Scotland comedy show Still Game.

Works

Operas
La Virgen de Mayo, 1 act (1925)
El poeta, 4 acts (1980)

Zarzuelas
La Mesonera de Tordesillas (1925)
La Marchenera (1928)
Azabache (1932)
Luisa Fernanda (1932)
Xuanón (1933)
La Chulapona (1934)
Sor Navarra (1938)
Maravilla (1941)
El Duende azul (1946, with Rodrigo)
Baile en Capitanía (1960)
Ella (1966)

Ballets
Fantasía de Levante (1957)
Don Quixote (1970)
El Hijo pródigo (1976)
Cristo, luz del mundo (1978)

Orchestral works
(see below for works with guitar)
La Ajorca de oro (1918)
Zoraida (1919)
Suite madrileña (1953)
Mosaico sevillano (1954)
Aires vascos (1956)
Danzas asturianas (1956)
San Fermín (1960)
Eritaña (1979)
Sonatina trianera (1980)
Fantasía castellana (1980) for piano and orchestra

Guitar works
Solo
Sonatina (1924)
Nocturno (1926)
Suite castellana (1926). Contains: 1. Fandanguillo; 2. Arada; 3. Danza.
Preludio (1928)
Burgalesa (1928)
Piezas características (1931). Contains: 1. Preámbulo; 2. Oliveras; 3. Melodía; 4. Albada; 5. Los Mayos; 6. Panorama.
Sonata-Fantasía (early 1950s)
Madrileñas (1953)
Zapateados (1953)
Segoviana (1956)
Sevillana (1956)
Once obras (1966)
Habanera de mi niña (1966)
Castillos de España ("Castles of Spain") (vol. 1, 1970; vol. 2, 1978). Contains: Sigüenza, Manzanares el Real, Alba de Tormes, Montemayor (Romance de los Pinos), Alcañiz, Javier, Torija, Simancas, Zafra, Turégano, Redaba, Alcázar de Segovia, Olite, Calatrava.
Tríptico (1973)
Las Puertas de Madrid (1976). Contains: Puerta de San Vicente; Puerta de Moros; Puerta de Toledo; Puerta de Alcalá; Puerta del Ángel; Puerta Cerrada; Puerta de Hierro.
Aires de La Mancha
Madroños
Serenata Burlesca
Siete Piezas de Álbum. Contains: Chisperada; Rumor de Copla; Minueto del Majo; ¡Ay, Malagueña!; Aire Vasco; Segoviana; Bolero Menorquín.
Sonatina y variación in E minor
Suite miniatura. Contains: Llamada; Tremolo; Vals; Divertimento.

Guitar with orchestra
Concerto de Castilla (1960)
Homenaje a la seguidilla (1962)
Tres nocturnos (1970)
Concerto ibérico (1976)
Diálogos (1977)

Guitar quartets
Ráfagas (1976)
Estampas (1979)
Sonata-Fantasía II (1976)
Sonata trianera (1980)

Piano works
Apetits pas (1913)
El Mate (1915)
Alegrías de Cadiz (1957)
Fandango corralero (1957)
Torerías (1957)
Chucares (1958)
Noche sevillana (1959)

Recordings with Moreno Torroba as conductor or performer

LP
Mosaico Andaluz – Orquesta De Conciertos De Madrid, Director y arreglador F. Moreno Torroba (Sello Hispavox, Año 1958. 45 R.P.M.)
Recordando El Ayer – Orquesta Federico Moreno Torroba (1961) 
La Voz de su Amo – Isabel Rivas, Luis Sagi-Vela, Tino Pardo, Ramón Alonso, Rosa Sarmiento, Mari Carmen Ramírez, Matilde Garcés, Enrique del Portal, Luis Frutos, Ana M.ª Amengual. Coro Cantores de Madrid, dir.: José Perera. Orquesta Lírica Española, dir.: Federico Moreno Torroba. (1968) 
Federico Moreno Torroba – Banda De Pasodobles De Madrid – Lp Pasodobles Toretos – RCA 1958
Ultimos Exitos De Lola Flores. Acompañada Por F. Moreno Torroba  Y Su Orquestra
Luisa Fernanda – Moreno Torroba
Corrida De Toros Con Oles
María Manuela
Moreno Torroba: Homenaje A La Seguidilla c/w Castelnuovo-Tedesco: Guitar Concerto In D, Op. 99. Ángel Romero, ECO, Federico Moreno Torroba. EMI: ASD 4171.

CD
 Luisa Fernanda. Moreno Torroba conducts, 1932. (Blue Moon, BMCD 7504)
 Azabache – Xuanon – Maria La Tempranica. Moreno Torroba conducts. (Blue Moon, BMCD 7544)
 La Caramba – Maravilla – La Ilustre Moza. Moreno Torroba conducts. (Blue Moon, BMCD 7526)

References

Literature
 Clark, Walter Aaron – Krause, William Craig: Federico Moreno Torroba: A Musical Life in Three Acts. Oxford: Oxford University Press, 2013. .

External links
 
 Luisa Fernanda Zarzuela, Aria of Umbrellas (YouTube)
 Mazurca of the umbrellas (YouTube)
Necrologías del Excmo. Sr. D. Federico Moreno Torroba. by Enrique Pardo Canalís (Boletín de la Real Academia de Bellas Artes de San Fernando. Segundo semestre de 1982. Número 55.) ref.
Articles from ABC Sevilla and ABC Madrid etc.click on      ▸ BUSQUEDA AVANZADA         (in small white letters, at the right-hand side)
El Maestro Moreno Torroba, 85 Anos de Juventud: 1, 2, 3

1891 births
1982 deaths
Musicians from Madrid
Spanish classical composers
Spanish male classical composers
Composers for the classical guitar
20th-century classical composers
Spanish opera composers
Male opera composers
20th-century Spanish composers
20th-century Spanish male musicians